Brian Eldon Frederick Cheesman (born 14 June 1929 in Shefford Woodlands, Berkshire) is a former English cricketer, a right-handed batsman who bowled right-arm off break.

He made his debut for Berkshire in the 1963 Minor Counties Championship against Dorset. Also in 1963 he made a single appearance for the Surrey Second XI against the Warwickshire Second XI in the Second Eleven Championship.

In 1965 he made his List-A debut for the club in the 1965 Gillette Cup against Somerset, which Berkshire lost by five wickets. The following season he played two List-A matches in the 1966 Gillette Cup against Hertfordshire, where he scored his highest List-A score of 31. In the Second Round he made his final List-A appearance against Gloucestershire.

His final appearance for Berkshire was in the 1966 Minor Counties Championship against Oxfordshire. He represented Berkshire 37 times in the championship.

External links
Brian Cheesman at Cricinfo
Brian Cheesman at CricketArchive

1929 births
Living people
People from West Berkshire District
English cricketers
Berkshire cricketers